From This Moment On is the ninth studio album by Canadian singer Diana Krall, released on September 19, 2006, by Verve Records. The album debuted atop the Canadian Albums Chart, making it Krall's third consecutive number-one album. It was nominated for Best Jazz Vocal Album at the 2007 Grammy Awards.

Critical reception

Christopher Loudon of JazzTimes wrote, "Never before, though, have her vocals or her playing evoked such profound contentment and easy self-assurance. Nor has any previous Krall standards set displayed such tremendous stylistic breadth." John Fordham of The Guardian stated that "From This Moment On is full of classy execution, but it's familiar territory for Krall and her fans.

David Was of NPR commented that "Diana Krall is the undisputed superstar of jazz-inflected singers in the last decade or so, and her new album on Verve, From This Moment On—mostly standards done with big-band arrangements—is a return to her usual form". Jane Cornwell of Jazzwise added, "Krall's skills as a pianist have never been in doubt but here her voice seems richer, her phrasing more natural, her timing very often inspired – particularly on an unhurried, soon-come version of Irving Berlin's 'Isn't It A Lovely Day'. It's the ensemble playing, though, which really marks this out as a good 'un – the thoughtful guitar of Anthony Wilson on 'Exactly Like You'; Terrell Stafford's trumpet solo on 'Isn't This...', the musical empathy throughout. Sure, it would be nice to have more Krall originals. But for the time being, here's the gal at her best".

Track listing

Personnel
Credits adapted from the liner notes of the European edition of From This Moment On.

Musicians

 Diana Krall – vocals ; piano solo ; piano ; arrangement 
 Gerald Clayton – piano 
 The Clayton–Hamilton Jazz Orchestra – featured artist 
 Jeff Clayton – alto saxophone solo ; soprano saxophone solo 
 Terell Stafford – trumpet solo 
 Ira Nepus – trombone solo 
 Anthony Wilson – acoustic guitar ; guitar 
 John Clayton – bass ; arrangement, conducting 
 Jeff Hamilton – drums 
 Gil Castellanos – trumpet solo 
 Tamir Hendelman – piano 
 Rickey Woodard – tenor saxophone solo

Technical

 Tommy LiPuma – production
 Diana Krall – production
 Al Schmitt – mixing, recording
 Steve Genewick – Pro Tools engineering, recording
 Rick Fernandez – engineering assistance
 Dan Johnson – engineering assistance
 Joe Napolitano – engineering assistance
 Bill Smith – engineering assistance
 Paul Smith – engineering assistance
 Doug Sax – mastering
 Sangwook Nam – mastering

Artwork
 Hollis King – art direction
 Coco Shinomiya – design
 Bruce Weber – photography
 Sam Taylor-Wood – back cover photo

Charts

Weekly charts

Year-end charts

Decade-end charts

Certifications

References

2006 albums
Albums produced by Tommy LiPuma
Albums recorded at Capitol Studios
Covers albums
Diana Krall albums
Juno Award for Vocal Jazz Album of the Year albums
Verve Records albums